Leasburg is the name of some places in the United States of America:
Leasburg, Missouri
Leasburg, New Mexico
Leasburg, North Carolina

See also
Leesburg (disambiguation)